TV Barrandov is a Czech television channel, launched in 2009. It was founded and started to broadcast in 2009. It currently broadcasts in Czech.

In 2015 after Chinese company CEFC China Energy invested in TV Barrandov's parent company Empresa Media, the tone of TV Barrandov's coverage of China changed with all neutral and negative reporting about China being replaced by positive reporting.

Foreign programs 

 True Blood
 Teen Wolf
 Gossip Girl
 The Originals
 Pretty Little Liars
 T@gged
 Light as a Feather
 Once Upon a Time
 Riverdale
 Killjoys
 Fear The Walking Dead
 The Vampire Diaries
 The Walking Dead
 Breaking Bad
 Arrow
 Matlock
 Pokémon

References

External links
Official website

Television in the Czech Republic
Barrandov
Television channels and stations established in 2009
Czech-language television stations

Television broadcasting companies of the Czech Republic